Mark P. Mays is the former president and CEO of Clear Channel Communications, Inc. the company his father, Lowry Mays founded, a global media and entertainment company based in San Antonio, Texas, United States. Mays took over as president and CEO in October 2004, after serving the company in other roles.

Early life
Mays graduated from the Hotchkiss School in Lakeville, Connecticut in 1981. Mays holds a B.A. from Vanderbilt University in Math and Economics, and an M.B.A. from Columbia Business School. Mays is an Eagle Scout.

In October 2007, 41 Democratic United States Senators sent a letter of request to Mays, asking him to renounce Rush Limbaugh for his comments allegedly referring to all soldiers who disagreed with the Iraq War as "phony soldiers". Mays gave Limbaugh the letter, who in turn auctioned it on eBay of behalf of the Marine Corps-Law Enforcement Foundation, netting $4.2 million in total for the charity, including the matching funds.

On February 4, 2007, Mays resigned from his position as Chairman at Live Nation.  On June 22, 2010, Mays announced his intention to step down as CEO at the end of 2010, but would remain as Chairman of the Board at Clear Channel. The announcement additionally directed the Board to begin a search for his replacement and was sent via email to all Clear Channel employees

Mays is a member of the National Executive Board of the Boy Scouts of America, the organization's governing body. He serves on the board of trust of his alma mater, Vanderbilt University.

References

Year of birth missing (living people)
Living people
Hotchkiss School alumni
Columbia Business School alumni
Vanderbilt University alumni
American chief executives in the media industry
American media executives
American chairpersons of corporations
National Executive Board of the Boy Scouts of America members